Blinisht is a village and a former municipality in the Lezhë County, northwestern Albania. At the 2015 local government reform it became a subdivision of the municipality Lezhë. The population at the 2011 census was 3,361.

Geography 
Blinisht is located in the Zadrima region.

Settlements 
The municipal unit includes 7 settlements:

Blinisht · Troshan · Fishtë · Krajnë · Piraj · Baqel · Kodhel

History 
The region has been subordinate both the Roman Catholic Diocese of Lezhë and Roman Catholic Diocese of Sapë.

People 
Pjetër Zarishi (1806-1866), Albanian catholic priest and poet

References 

Former municipalities in Lezhë County
Administrative units of Lezhë
Villages in Lezhë County